Obby may refer to:

 Hobby horses, as in the slang phrase "'obby 'oss" (e.g., 'Obby 'Oss festival)
 Obby Khan, Canadian football player
 Obby Kapita (died 2002), Zambian football player and coach
 Obstacle course in Roblox video games